NGC 5753 is a spiral galaxy in the constellation Boötes. This is a member of the Arp 297 interacting galaxies group of four: NGC 5752, NGC 5753, NGC 5754, NGC 5755.

References

External links 

Distance
Image NGC 5753

SIMBAD data

NGC 05753
5753
09642
Interacting galaxies
+07-30-062
Spiral galaxies